In linguistics, an internationalism or international word is a loanword that occurs in several languages (that is, translingually) with the same or at least similar meaning and etymology. These words exist in "several different languages as a result of simultaneous or successive borrowings from the ultimate source" (I.V.Arnold). Pronunciation and orthography are similar so that the word is understandable between the different languages.

It is debated how many languages are required for a word to be considered an internationalism. Furthermore, the languages required can also depend on the specific target language at stake. For example, according to Ghil'ad Zuckermann, the most important languages that should include the same lexical item in order for it to qualify as an internationalism in Hebrew are Yiddish, Polish, Russian, French, German and English.

The term is uncommon in English, although English has contributed a considerable number of words to world languages, e.g., the sport terms football, baseball, cricket, and golf.

International scientific vocabulary is a class of terms that contains many internationalisms. For some of them it is known which modern language used them first, whereas for others it is not traceable, but the chronologic sequence is usually of limited practical importance anyway, as almost immediately after their origination they appeared in multiple languages.

Origins
European internationalisms originate primarily from Latin or Greek, but from other languages as well. However, due to English being the main lingua franca of the Western world, an increasing number of internationalisms originate from English. Many non-European words have also become international.

Diffusion
Internationalisms often spread together with the innovations they designate. Accordingly, there are semantic fields dominated by specific languages, e.g. the computing vocabulary which is mainly English with internationalisms such as computer, disk, and spam. New inventions, political institutions, foodstuffs, leisure activities, science, and technological advances have all generated new lexemes and continue to do so: bionics, cybernetics, gene, coffee, chocolate, etc..

Some internationalisms are spread by speakers of one language living in geographical regions where other languages are spoken.  For example, some internationalisms coming from the English in India are bungalow, jute, khaki, mango, pyjamas, and sari.

Use in constructed IALs

Due to their widespread use, internationalisms are often loaned into international auxiliary languages. Many constructed IALs borrow vocabulary that is already known by learners, so that they are as easy as possible to learn.

Internationalisms that occur in many languages are usually eligible to be included in Interlingua. Early internationalisms, such as those from French and German, tend to be part of Interlingua's basic vocabulary. Later internationalisms, often from English, tend to be Interlingua loanwords. Among Asian languages, Arabic most often provides basic vocabulary, while Japanese contributes recent loanwords.

Examples

Academy
Airport
Ambulance
Ananas (pineapple in English)
Antenna
Athlete
Atom
Automobile
Ballerina
Ballet
Bar
Blog
Bravo
Bus
Cabin
Cable
Centre (or center)
Chocolate
Coffee
Colony
Comedy
Computer
Copy
Corridor
Coupon
Delta
Design
Dictator
Diploma
Doctor
Foxtrot
Golf
Gorilla
Harmony
Hospital
Hotel
Inspection
International
Internet
Interview
League
Literature
Machine
Magnet
Mama
Margarine
Marmalade
Massage
Medal
Medicine
Menu
Metro
Microphone
Microscope
Motor
Number
Okay (or OK)
Olympiad
Operation
papa
Party
Pedal
Pistol
Police
Politics
Psychology
quiz
Radio
Register
Sandal
Sardine
Satan
Sauna
Shock
Signal
Sport
Station
Stress
Studio
Taboo
Tango
Taxi
Telephone
Telescope
Television
Tennis
Test
Tokamak
Tomahawk
Tractor
Transport
Tsunami
Uniform
Visa
Whiskey
X-ray

See also
 International scientific vocabulary
 Interlingua
 Hybrid word
 Classical compound
 Greek and Latin roots in English
 Phono-semantic matching

Further reading
 Peter Braun, Burkhard Schaeder, Johannes Volmert (eds.): Internationalismen II. Studien zur interlingualen Lexikologie und Lexikographie (Reihe Germanistische Linguistik. Band 246), Tübingen: Niemeyer 2003, .

References

Historical linguistics
Interlingua
Etymology